Janibacter terrae is a bacterium from the genus Janibacter which has been isolated from soil in Korea. Janibacter terrae is able to degrade trichloroethylene. Janibacter brevis was originally classified as its own species, but was later found to be a heterotypic synonym of J. terrae.

References

 

Intrasporangiaceae
Bacteria described in 2000